Sam Jamieson is the name of:

Sam Jamieson (footballer), Scottish footballer
Sam Jamieson (sprinter), Australian sprinter